Annaba  is a province (wilaya) in the north-eastern corner of Algeria. Its capital, Annaba, is Algeria's main port for mineral exports.

History
In 1984 El Taref Province was carved out its territory.

Administrative divisions
The province is divided into 6 districts and 12 municipalities.

The districts are:

 Annaba
 Aïn El Berda
 El Hadjar
 Berrahal
 Chetaïbi
 El Bouni

The municipalities are:

 Annaba
 Aïn Berda (Aïn El Berda)
 Barrahel
 Chetaïbi
 Cheurfa
 El Bouni
 El Hadjar
 Eulma
 Oued El Aneb
 Seraïdi
 Sidi Amar
 Treat

References

External links
 A website about Annaba and its surroundings

 
Provinces of Algeria
States and territories established in 1974